September 29 - Eastern Orthodox liturgical calendar - October 1

All fixed commemorations below celebrated on October 13 by Eastern Orthodox Churches on the Old Calendar.

For September 30th, Orthodox Churches on the Old Calendar commemorate the Saints listed on September 17.

Saints
 Hieromartyr Gregory the Illuminator, Bishop and Enlightener of Greater Armenia (c. 335)
 Martyrs Rhipsima and Gaiana with 35 Virgin-Martyrs, in Armenia (early 4th century)
 Holy seventy (70) martyrs, with St. Rhipsima (4th century)
 Holy 1000 martyrs, by the sword. 
 Martyr Stratonicus, by the sword.
 Martyr Mardonius, by burning out his eyes.

Pre-Schism Western saints
 Martyr Sophia, mother of the virgin-martyrs Faith, Hope and Charity, at Rome (c. 173)  (see also: September 17 - East)
 Martyrs Victor and Ursus, two soldiers connected with the Theban Legion and venerated in Soleure in Switzerland (286)
 Saint Antoninus, a soldier of the Theban Legion, martyred on the banks of the Trebbia near Piacenza in Italy (3rd century)
 Saint Leopardus, a servant or slave in the household of Julian the Apostate, likely martyred in Rome (362)
 Blessed Jerome (Hieronymus) of Stridonium (420)  (see also: June 15 - East)
 Saint Midan (Nidan), a saint on Anglesey in Wales (c. 610)
 Saint Honorius, Archbishop of Canterbury, Confessor (653)
 Saint Enghenedl, a church in Anglesey in Wales was dedicated to him (7th century)
 Saint Laurus (Lery), born in Wales, he went to Brittany and founded the monastery later called after him, Saint-Léry, on the River Doneff (7th century)
 Martyr-hermits Tancred, Torthred, and Tova, three Anglo-Saxon siblings of Thorney.

Post-Schism Orthodox saints
 Saint Michael, Great Prince of Tver (1318)
 Venerable Gregory, founder of Pelshma Monastery in Vologda, Wonderworker (1442)
 Saint Meletius I Pegas, Patriarch of Alexandria (1601)  (see also: September 13 - Greek)

New martyrs and confessors
 New Hieromartyr Prokopius Popov, Priest (1918)
 New Hieromartyrs (1937):
 Peter Solovyov, Viacheslav (Wenceslaus) Zankov, Peter Pushkinsky, Symeon Lileev, Basil Guriev, Alexander Orlov, Priests; 
 Seraphim Vasilenko, Deacon; 
 Virgin-martyr Alexandra (Chervyakova), Schemanun, of Moscow (1937) 
 Martyrs Alexis Serebrennikov and Matthew Solovyov;  
 Virgin-martyr Apollinaria Tupitsyna.
 New Hieromartyr Leonidas Prendkovich, Priest (1938)
 New Hiero-confessor Seraphim (Zagorovsky), Hieromonk, of Kharkov (1943)

Other commemorations
 Translation of the relics (c. 1103) of St. Michael (992), First Metropolitan of Kiev.

Icon gallery

Notes

References

Sources
 September 30/October 13. Orthodox Calendar (PRAVOSLAVIE.RU).
 October 13 / September 30. HOLY TRINITY RUSSIAN ORTHODOX CHURCH (A parish of the Patriarchate of Moscow).
 September 30. OCA - The Lives of the Saints.
 The Autonomous Orthodox Metropolia of Western Europe and the Americas (ROCOR). St. Hilarion Calendar of Saints for the year of our Lord 2004. St. Hilarion Press (Austin, TX). p. 73.
 The Thirtieth Day of the Month of September. Orthodoxy in China.
 September 30. Latin Saints of the Orthodox Patriarchate of Rome.
 The Roman Martyrology. Transl. by the Archbishop of Baltimore. Last Edition, According to the Copy Printed at Rome in 1914. Revised Edition, with the Imprimatur of His Eminence Cardinal Gibbons. Baltimore: John Murphy Company, 1916. pp. 301–302.
 Rev. Richard Stanton. A Menology of England and Wales, or, Brief Memorials of the Ancient British and English Saints Arranged According to the Calendar, Together with the Martyrs of the 16th and 17th Centuries. London: Burns & Oates, 1892. pp. 466–467.

 Greek Sources
 Great Synaxaristes:  30 ΣΕΠΤΕΜΒΡΙΟΥ. ΜΕΓΑΣ ΣΥΝΑΞΑΡΙΣΤΗΣ.
  Συναξαριστής. 30 Σεπτεμβρίου. ECCLESIA.GR. (H ΕΚΚΛΗΣΙΑ ΤΗΣ ΕΛΛΑΔΟΣ).
  30/09/2016. Ορθόδοξος Συναξαριστής.

 Russian Sources
  13 октября (30 сентября). Православная Энциклопедия под редакцией Патриарха Московского и всея Руси Кирилла (электронная версия). (Orthodox Encyclopedia - Pravenc.ru).
  30 сентября по старому стилю / 13 октября по новому стилю. Русская Православная Церковь - Православный церковный календарь на 2016 год.

September in the Eastern Orthodox calendar